Rainbow Lakes Estates is an unincorporated community and census-designated place (CDP) in Marion and Levy counties, Florida, United States, established as a Municipal Services District. The Marion County part of the community is part of the Ocala metropolitan area, while the Levy County portion is part of the Gainesville metropolitan area. It was first listed as a CDP for the 2020 census, at which time it had a population of 3,438.

The community is northwest of Rainbow Springs, a natural spring in nearby Rainbow Springs State Park. There are various community owned and maintained facilities as well as paved roads. A large percentage of the platted building lots are unimproved.

Geography

References

External links

Unincorporated communities in Marion County, Florida
Unincorporated communities in Levy County, Florida
Unincorporated communities in Florida
Census-designated places in Marion County, Florida
Census-designated places in Levy County, Florida